Ayagoz or Ayakoz (Aiagöz), formerly Sergiopol, is a city of regional significance in Kazakhstan, the administrative centre of Ayagoz district of East Kazakhstan Region.  Population:

Geography
It is located at the southeastern end of the Chingiztau range, on the banks of the river Ayagöz.

History
The town was incorporated in 1939 under the authority of the USSR.

In 1991 it became an administrative center of Ayagoz District.

Climate 
Ayagoz has a warm, dry-summer continental climate (Dsb) in the Köppen climate classification.

References

Populated places in East Kazakhstan Region
Populated places established in 1831